= Amrabad Kalan =

- village
- Location within Madhya Pradesh Location within India
- Coordinates: 23.1121386°N 77.438643°E
- Country: India
- State: Madhya Pradesh
- District: Bhopal
- Tehsil: Huzur

Population (2011)
  - Total: 734
- Time zone: UTC+5:30 (IST)
- ISO 3166 code: MP-IN
- Census code: 482535

Amrabad Kalan is a village in the Bhopal district of Madhya Pradesh, India. It is located in the Huzur tehsil and the Phanda block.

== Demographics ==
According to the 2011 census of India, Amrabad Kalan has 153 households. The effective literacy rate (i.e. the literacy rate of population excluding children aged 6 and below) is 75.45%.

Demographics (2011 Census)
	Total	Male	Female
Population	734	350	384
Children aged below 6 years	119	55	64
Scheduled caste	73	32	41
Scheduled tribe	24	11	13
Literates	464	264	200
Workers (all)	239	165	74
Main workers (total)	165	154	11
Main workers: Cultivators	53	53	0
Main workers: Agricultural labourers	9	5	4
Main workers: Household industry workers	0	0	0
Main workers: Other	103	96	7
Marginal workers (total)	74	11	63
Marginal workers: Cultivators	3	2	1
Marginal workers: Agricultural labourers	3	3	0
Marginal workers: Household industry workers	0	0	0
Marginal workers: Others	68	6	62
Non-workers	495	185	310
